Alain Silver is a US film producer, director, and screenwriter; music producer; film critic, film historian, DVD commentator, author and editor of books and essays on film topics, especially film noir, the samurai film, and horror films. Filmmakers about whom he has written include David Lean, Robert Aldrich, Raymond Chandler, Roger Corman, and James Wong Howe.

Career

Education
Silver graduated from UCLA with degrees in film production (B.A.) and critical studies (M.A. and PhD).

Film production

Silver entered the film industry through the Assistant Directors Training Program and was a trainee, second assistant and first assistant director on movies such as Every Which Way But Loose, The Manitou, and The Bad News Bears in Breaking Training and on television series such as Police Woman, Angie, Mork and Mindy and Laverne and Shirley. In 1981, Silver began working as a production manager and producer. Since that time Silver has been executive or supervising producer on a number of movies such as The Creature Wasn't Nice, Prince Jack, The Ratings Game, Mortuary Academy, Hold Me, Thrill Me, Kiss Me, The Quickie, 10th & Wolf, The Kings of Appletown and The 7. With Linda Brookover he co-wrote and was Executive Producer of the Showtime family feature Time at the Top. Silver has also produced sixteen independent features, including Kiss Daddy Goodbye, Prime Suspect, Night Visitor, Cyborg 2, Beat, The Creature of the Sunny Side Up Trailer Park, Crashing, Changing the Game, Sacred Blood (which he also wrote), Radio Mary, and Torch as well documentaries, music videos, and segments for the TV reality series America's Most Wanted and I Survived!. He wrote and directed the short films A Fish in the Desert (2002) and Texas Vampire Massacre (2004) and the narrative features White Nights (adapted from Dostoyevsky, 2005) and Nightcomer (aka Blood Cure, 2013)).

Silver has given lectures on production and appeared on and moderated panels for the Directors Guild of America, Writers Guild of America, West and at various festival venues such as the Slamdance Film Festival and Cinequest Film Festival.

Writing
Silver has written and edited more than thirty books, mostly with James Ursini or Elizabeth Ward, including film Noir Fatal Women; The Noir Style; The Samurai Film; Film Noir the Encyclopedia; Raymond Chandler's Los Angeles; Film Noir Readers 1, 2, 3 and 4; Film Noir Graphics: Where Danger Lives; Film Noir Compendium; Film Noir Light and Shadow; Film Noir Prototypes; L.A. Noir: the City as Character; Gangster Film Reader; Horror Film Reader; Film Noir the Directors; David Lean and his Films; What Ever Happened to Robert Aldrich; More Things than Are Dreamt Of; The Vampire Film; Roger Corman: Metaphysics on a Shoestring; James Wong Howe: The Camera Eye; Steve McQueen, Frank Sinatra, Sean Connery and Katharine Hepburn for the Taschen Icon series; The Film Director's Team; Film Budgeting; and Movies Without Baggage.  Silver has also written numerous articles on Raymond Chandler, samurai cinema, film noir, vampire films, and other topics on film history and production. He has provided audio and video commentary on the DVD titles listed below. He has done film noir visual presentations on the long take, Billy Wilder and Double Indemnity, and visual style for Hillsdale College and "A Noir Tour of L.A." at the Los Angeles Film Festival.

He has also produced more than fifty soundtrack albums for Citadel Records and Bay Cities Music. He is a member of the Directors Guild of America, the Screen Actors Guild, and the Writers Guild of America, West.

List of audio commentaries
 Boomerang, with film historian James Ursini
 Brute Force, with James Ursini
 Burn!, with James Ursini
 Call Northside 777, with James Ursini
 Crossfire, with James Ursini
 The Dark Corner, with James Ursini
 The Egyptian, with James Ursini
 He Walked by Night. with James Ursini
 Hobson's Choice, with James Ursini
 House of Bamboo, with James Ursini
 Hustle, with James Ursini
 Internal Affairs, with James Ursini
 Invisible Stripes, with James Ursini
 Kiss Me Deadly, with James Ursini
 Kiss of Death, with James Ursini
 Lady in the Lake, with James Ursini
 The Lodger, with James Ursini
 The Longest Yard, with James Ursini
 Murder, My Sweet
 Mystery Street, with film historian Elizabeth Ward
 Nightmare Alley, with James Ursini
 Panic in the Streets, with James Ursini
 Ride the Pink Horse, with James Ursini
 The River's Edge, with James Ursini
 Smart Money, with James Ursini
 The Street with No Name, with James Ursini
 Tension, with Elizabeth Ward and actress Audrey Totter
 Thieves' Highway
 Twilight, with James Ursini
 The Wayward Bus, with James Ursini
 Where Danger Lives, with James Ursini

See also
 Film noir
 Samurai cinema
 David Lean
 Robert Aldrich

References

External links
 Alain Silver's homepage
 
 Review of Film Noir: the Encyclopedia at Bright Lights Film Journal
 Review of Film Noir the Directors at the DGA Magazine
 Appearance in the documentary Los Angeles: The City of Film Noir

American film producers
American screenwriters
American film historians
American male non-fiction writers
Film theorists
Living people
University of California, Los Angeles alumni
UCLA Film School alumni
Year of birth missing (living people)